Kamen Trifonov (born 27 July 1990) is a Bulgarian footballer. He played for Cherno More Varna from 2008-2010 and was loaned to Dobrudzha Dobrich from 2010-2011.

Career
Officially still a B-junior, Trifonov became a regular in the A-juniors side during the 2008–2009 season. His first game for Cherno More was in A PFG on 14 June 2009 against Minyor Pernik.

References

External links

1990 births
Living people
Bulgarian footballers
First Professional Football League (Bulgaria) players
PFC Cherno More Varna players
PFC Dobrudzha Dobrich players
Association football defenders